Tropidophis battersbyi, also known commonly as Battersby's dwarf boa and the Ecuadorian dwarf boa, is a species of snake in the family Tropidophiidae. The species is endemic to Ecuador.

Etymology
The specific name, battersbyi, is in honor of British herpetologist James Clarence Battersby (1901–1993).

Description
Dorsally, T. battersbyi has four rows of large dark spots. It has a high number of ventral scales, up to 200. It has a low number of maxillary teeth, only 12.

Reproduction
T. battersbyi is viviparous.

References

Further reading
Freiberg M (1982). Snakes of South America. Hong Kong: T.F.H. Publications. 189 pp. . (Tropidophis battersbyi, p. 88).
Hedges SB (2002). "Morphological variation and the definition of species in the snake genus Tropidophis (Serpentes, Tropidophiidae)". Bulletin of the Natural History Museum, London, Zoology 68 (2): 83–90.
Laurent RF (1949). "Note sur quelques reptiles appartenant à la collection de l'Institut royal des Sciences naturelles de Belgique. III. Formes américaines ". Bulletin de l'Institut royal des Sciences naturelles de Belgique 25 (9): 1-20. (Tropidophis battersbyi, new species, p. 6). (in French).

Tropidophiidae
Snakes of South America
Reptiles of Ecuador
Endemic fauna of Ecuador
Reptiles described in 1949
Taxa named by Raymond Laurent